The black-breasted parrotbill (Paradoxornis flavirostris) is a 19 cm long, large, thick-billed parrotbill with black patches on the head-sides and throat. Formerly placed with the typical warblers in the Sylviidae (Jønsson & Fjeldså 2006), the parrotbills are now considered a distinct family, the Paradoxornithidae.

The bird is more or less brown all over, with an extensive black area on upper breast and uniform rufous-buff remainder of underparts. The similar spot-breasted parrotbill, a close relative, has arrow-shaped spotting on breast and pale buff underparts. Alternatively, a higher-pitched  is given.(BLI 2006)

Paradoxornis flavirostris is endemic to the Indian subcontinent and in modern times possibly the country of India, where it is known from the plains and foothills of the Brahmaputra valley in Arunachal Pradesh and Assam. Historically, it was also recorded in Bangladesh and possibly eastern Nepal. It used to be a fairly widespread and locally common species. There are, however, recent records from only three disjunct locations, one in Arunachal Pradesh and two in Assam (one in Manas National Park and another in Dibru-Saikhowa National Park) (BLI 2006).

Gallery

References

 BirdLife International (BLI) (2006): Species factsheet: Paradoxornis flavirostris. Retrieved 2007-APR-07.
Jønsson, Knud A. & Fjeldså, Jon (2006): A phylogenetic supertree of oscine passerine birds (Aves: Passeri). Zool. Scripta 35(2): 149–186.  (HTML abstract)
Robson, C. (2007). Family Paradoxornithidae (Parrotbills) pp. 292 – 321 in; del Hoyo, J., Elliott, A. & Christie, D.A. eds. Handbook of the Birds of the World, Vol. 12. Picathartes to Tits and Chickadees. Lynx Edicions, Barcelona.

black-breasted parrotbill
Birds of Northeast India
black-breasted parrotbill